Abdullah Omar Nasseef (born 5 July 1939 in Jeddah, Saudi Arabia) is a Saudi chemist and geologist, and serves as Chief Scout of the Saudi Arabian Boy Scouts Association, which he joined in 1956.

Nasseef has a Ph.D degree from Leeds University in the United Kingdom.

He is a professor at King Abdulaziz University in Jeddah. He is chairman of the World Muslim Congress, chairman of the founding board of Sahm Al-Nour Trust, and former Secretary General of Muslim World League in 1983-1993. He has served as Vice-President of the Consultative Assembly of Saudi Arabia, President of King Abdul Aziz University, and Secretary-General of the International Islamic Council for Da'wah and Relief (IICDR).

In 1983 Nasseef was awarded the Bronze Wolf, the only distinction of the World Organization of the Scout Movement, awarded by the World Scout Committee for exceptional services to world Scouting.

References

Scouting and Guiding in Saudi Arabia
1939 births
Living people
Recipients of the Bronze Wolf Award
People from Jeddah
Academic staff of King Abdulaziz University
Alumni of the University of Leeds